Raven Hill Discovery Center is a collection of indoor and outdoor exhibits for hands-on learning by children and adults in Michigan, United States. Established in 1991 they are primarily a Science Center but have a combined focus with history and art as well as nature and biology.

History
Established as a non-profit organization in 1991 by Cheri and Tim Leach.  They have continued to expand their outdoor exhibits and in the Fall of 2011 they expanded their indoor capacity.

Purpose
Raven Hill Discovery Center is a regional science and technology center, as well as a cultural, historical and art center.

References 

Museums in Charlevoix County, Michigan
Science museums in Michigan
History museums in Michigan
Nature centers in Michigan
Natural history museums in Michigan
Children's museums in Michigan